Dael is a given name. Notable people with the name include:

Dael Fry (born 1997), English footballer
Dael Orlandersmith (born 1960), American actress, poet, and playwright

See also
Dale (given name)
Wael